John de Warenne may refer to:

John de Warenne, 6th Earl of Surrey (1231–1304)
John de Warenne, 7th Earl of Surrey (1286–1347)